The 1985 Middle Tennessee Blue Raiders football team represented Middle Tennessee State University in the 1985 NCAA Division I-AA football season

Schedule

References

Middle Tennessee
Middle Tennessee Blue Raiders football seasons
Ohio Valley Conference football champion seasons
Middle Tennessee Blue Raiders football